The Apostolic Vicariate (Vicariate Apostolic) of Puyo is an Apostolic Vicariate (missionary pre-diocesan circumscription) of the Roman Catholic Church. It has a cathedral see, the Catedral Nuestra Señora del Rosario, located in the city of Puyo, capital of Pastaza Province in Ecuador's Amazon rainforest.

History 
On 4 October 1886, Pope Leo XIII established the Prefecture Apostolic of Canelos y Macas from the Vicariate Apostolic of Napo. Its name was changed to the Apostolic Prefecture  of Canelos by Pope Pius XI on 19 February 1930. 
 
The prefecture was elevated to the status of Vicariate Apostolic of Canelos by Pope Paul VI on 29 September 1964. Its name was changed to the Vicariate Apostolic of Puyo on 18 May 1976.

It remains exempt, i.e. directly subject to the Holy See, not part of any ecclesiastical province.

Incumbent Ordinaries
Apostolic prefects of Canelos (y Macas) (all Dominicans)
("y Macas" dropped 19 Feb. 1930)
Enrique Ezequiel Vacas Galindo, O.P. † (1898 - 1909)
Alvaro Valladares, O.P. † (29 July 1909 - 17 March 1926)
Agostino M. León, O.P. † (17 March 1926 – June 1936)
Giacinto Maria D’Avila, O.P. † (16 Sep. 1936 – 1948)
Sebastião Acosta Hurtado, O.P. † (12 Nov. 1948 – 1958)
Alberto Zambrano Palacios, O.P. † (24 Jan. 1959 – 29 Sept. 1964); see below

Apostolic vicars of Canelos / Puyo
(change from "Canelos" to "Puyo" 18 May 1976)
Alberto Zambrano Palacios, O.P. † (29 Sept 1964 - 11 Dec. 1972), appointed Bishop of Loja; see above
Tomás Angel Romero Gross, O.P. † (5 July 1973 – 28 Feb. 1990)
Frumencio Escudero Arenas (6 Oct. 1992 – 25 July 1998)
Rafael Cob García (28 Nov. 1998 – present)

See also 
 Roman Catholicism in Ecuador

Sources and References 

Apostolic vicariates
Roman Catholic dioceses in Ecuador
Religious organizations established in 1886
1886 establishments in South America
Puyo, Pastaza